Suspilne Uzhhorod, is a regional Ukrainian-language TV channel for the Zakarpattia region of Ukraine. It is part of Suspilne, the national public broadcaster. It is the brand name of the Transcarpathian Regional Television and Radio Company.

Its headquarters is situated in Uzhhorod. ZODTRK it is based in 1968. UA: Zakarpattia was launched in November, 2005 covering only Uzhhorod and Uzhhorod Raion. In September, 2006 it became the first Ukrainian regional TV channel broadcasting through satellite. It is broadcast through Astra 4A, 4.8E, Freq. 12672, Pol. H, S/R 3300, FEC 3/4; Astra 1G, 31.5E, DVB-S2, Freq. 12012, Pol. V, S/R 27500, FEC 9/10, and it can be viewed in most of Europe. Today, the channel has permission to broadcast 24 hours a day.

External links 
Official site

Television stations in Ukraine
Ukrainian brands
Mass media in Uzhhorod
Television channels and stations established in 1968
Publicly funded broadcasters